Ciputra World Jakarta is a mixed development complex, which is built by PT. Ciputra Development Tbk, located on Jalan Prof.  Dr.  Satrio, Mega Kuningan, South Jakarta, Indonesia. With a total land area of 15 hectares, Ciputra World Jakarta planned to have 15 towers. It is divided in three separate but adjacent land blocks.

Ciputra World 1 Jakarta'' has a land area of 5.5 hectares. The complex includes three towers; Raffles Hotel and Raffles Residences Jakarta; My Home Apartments & Ascott Service Apartment; and DBS Bank Tower. Ciputra Artpreneur Center (Museum, Theatre & Gallery) and a shopping centre (Lotte Shopping Avenue) is also located in the complex. This is one of the largest buildings in the world by floor area.Ciputra World 2 Jakarta  has a land area of 4.5 hectares. The development has six towers used for office space; W Hotels Jakarta and the Hotel Apartment, the Office Satrio, the Orchard Condominium, the Residence and Fraser Suites Serviced Apartment, and The Newton 1, 2 apartment towers. The office building (known as Tokopedia Tower) houses Tokopedia, which is one of Indonesia’s biggest online marketplace. The project is also equipped with a green area of about 60% of the land area.Ciputra World 3 Jakarta'''   is planned to  have conference & exhibition centre with a large capacity.

See also

List of tallest buildings in Jakarta
Ciputra World Surabaya

References

Buildings and structures in Jakarta
Residential skyscrapers in Indonesia
Skyscraper office buildings in Indonesia
Skyscraper hotels
Shopping malls in Jakarta
Post-independence architecture of Indonesia
South Jakarta